Tarache lanceolata is a species of bird dropping moth in the family Noctuidae first described by Augustus Radcliffe Grote in 1879. It is found in North America.

The MONA or Hodges number for Tarache lanceolata is 9153.

References

Further reading

External links
 

Acontiinae
Articles created by Qbugbot
Moths described in 1879